Kərimli or Kerimli may refer to:
Kərimli, Gadabay, Azerbaijan
Kərimli, Oghuz, Azerbaijan